The 36th Street station was a station on the demolished section of the BMT Fifth Avenue Line in Brooklyn, New York City. It was served by trains of the BMT Culver Line and BMT Fifth Avenue Line. It had four tracks and two island platforms. The station was opened on May 29, 1890, and was the southern terminus of the Fifth Avenue Line until 1893, as well as the southernmost station to be installed along Fifth Avenue itself. Stations built beyond this point were located along Third Avenue, and the line was sometimes called the BMT Third Avenue Line south of here. The next stop to the north was 25th Street. The next stop to the south was Ninth Avenue for Culver Line trains and 40th Street for Fifth Avenue Line trains. Ninth Avenue station still exists today exclusively for the BMT West End Line. The station closed on May 31, 1940. Current rapid transit service in this area can be found one block west at the 36th Street station on the underground BMT Fourth Avenue Line.

References

BMT Fifth Avenue Line stations
Railway stations in the United States opened in 1890
Railway stations closed in 1940
Former elevated and subway stations in Brooklyn
Sunset Park, Brooklyn